Mohammadjafar Khan Gerashi, son of Rostam Khan Gerashi and grandson of Fathali Khan Gerashi, known as Moghtader-ol-Mamalek and better known as his pen-name Sheyda, was a Persian Poet and Panegyrist.
He was born in Gerash, Fars, Iran on 3 December 1879, and on 3 April 1920 in a local war in Sahray-ye Bagh, was killed. From him remains a Diwan contains the lyrics, quatrains, odes, dirges, etc., that published by Ahmad Eghtedari.

See also
List of Persian poets and authors
Gerash

References
 The Diwan of Sheyda Gerashi, published by Ahmad Eghtedari in Hamsayeh publications, in 1997. 
 Website of Gerash ICOMOS.

1879 births
1920 deaths
20th-century Iranian poets
Iranian male poets
20th-century male writers